George Abege Opio (born 5 March 1993) is a Ugandan striker who currently plays for Sri Lanka's Up Country Lions SC. He formerly turned out for Kenyan Premier League sides Nairobi City Stars, Bandari F.C. (Kenya) and Kariobangi Sharks, as well as Ghana Premier League side Asante Kotoko S.C.

Career
George started out at Maroon's FC Luzira, Luweroo United in Uganda before joining SC Victoria University in 2013. He then came to Kenya where he spent the 2014 season at Nairobi City Stars. 

In 2015 he moved to Coastal side Bandari F.C. (Kenya) till the end of the 2016 season then head West to join SoNy Sugar F.C. for the 2017 and 2018 seasons. 

He was back in Nairobi for the second half of the 2018 season after joining FC Kariobangi Sharks. At the start of that year, he had been linked with a move to another Kenyan premiership side Posta Rangers F.C. but for unknown reasons, he remained at SoNy. 

At the end of the 2018/19 season, George moved to the Ghanaian league by joining Asante Kotoko S.C. on a three-year deal. However, after a few months, he left the club and was then linked with a move to Ugandan side URA FC. In April of 2021 he moved to Sri Lanka's Up Country Lions SC.

Continental
Abege first ventured into continental football with Bandari in 2016 by virtue of the club winning the domestic Cup in 2015. He made his debut as a second half susbtitue in the first leg of the preliminary round  against DR Congo's FC Saint-Éloi Lupopo. He featured in the return leg before the team exited the 2016 CAF Confederation Cup qualifying rounds. 

Abege was back at it with FC Kariobangi Sharks in 2019 featuring in two games in the 2018–19 CAF Confederation Cup qualifying rounds against Arta/Solar7. He scored his maiden continental goal in a 6–1 win in the first leg and scored once more in the 3–0 away win. He played two further games in the first round against Asante Kotoko F.C. who knocked Sharks out with a 2–1 aggregate win. The team signed him after the two games.

International career
George earned his maiden, and only Ugandan international cap, in a friendly against South Sudan  on 10 July 2012 held at the Juba Stadium. In 2015 he openly stated his wish for more consideration at the National team fold.

Honours

Club
SC Victoria University
 Ugandan Cup: 2012-2013
Bandari
 2015 FKF President's Cup
 2016 Kenyan Super Cup
Kariobangi Sharks
 2018 FKF President's Cup

References

External links
 
 

Living people
1993 births
Ugandan footballers
Association football forwards
SC Victoria University players
Nairobi City Stars players
F.C. Kariobangi Sharks players
SoNy Sugar F.C. players
Asante Kotoko S.C. players
Kenyan Premier League players